Hut in the Woods is a 2011 German drama film directed by Hans Weingartner.

Cast 
 Peter Schneider - Martin
 Timur Massold - Viktor
  - Lena
 Eleonore Weisgerber - Doctor
 Andreas Leupold - Martin's father
  - Banker
  - Personalchef
 Julia Jentsch - Petra

References

External links 

2011 drama films
2011 films
German drama films
2010s German films
Films directed by Hans Weingartner